Arthur Edward Remington (28 July 1856 – 17 August 1909) was a Liberal Party Member of Parliament in New Zealand.

Biography

Remington was born in 1856 at New Plymouth. Due to the New Zealand Wars, the family returned to their native Jersey, where he received his education. The family returned to New Zealand in 1868, first settling in Auckland, but soon residing in Tauranga, where he first became involved in local body politics.

In 1877, Remington moved to Bulls, where he was a chemist selling tooth powder, which was advanced at the time. He was declared bankrupt in 1879.

Remington first stood for Parliament in the Patea electorate in 1896 and 1899, coming second both times.
He also stood in the first  against an "official" Liberal candidate, which allowed  an opponent of the Liberal Government to win.

He won the Rangitikei electorate in the 1902 general election, and held it until he died in 1909.

Remington died at his home in Tinakori Road, Wellington. He was survived by his wife Elizabeth Susanna Remington.

Notes

References

New Zealand Liberal Party MPs
1856 births
1909 deaths
New Zealand pharmacists
New Zealand MPs for North Island electorates
Members of the New Zealand House of Representatives
Unsuccessful candidates in the 1896 New Zealand general election
Unsuccessful candidates in the 1899 New Zealand general election
19th-century New Zealand politicians